The October 2003 Madrilenian regional election was held on Sunday, 26 October 2003, to elect the 7th Assembly of the Community of Madrid. All 111 seats in the Assembly were up for election. It was a snap election, held as a result of the parliamentary deadlock resulting from the Tamayazo scandal after the May 2003 election.

The People's Party (PP) recovered the absolute majority it had lost in the previous election. This came at the expense of the Spanish Socialist Workers' Party (PSOE), which suffered from the scandal of the rebel MPs who refused to support a PSOE–IU government led by Rafael Simancas. United Left (IU) saw a slight increase in support but failed to translate its gains into new seats. As a result of the election, Esperanza Aguirre was elected as President of the Community of Madrid, becoming the first woman to be appointed to the office.

Overview

Electoral system
The Assembly of Madrid was the devolved, unicameral legislature of the autonomous community of Madrid, having legislative power in regional matters as defined by the Spanish Constitution and the Madrilenian Statute of Autonomy, as well as the ability to vote confidence in or withdraw it from a regional president.

Voting for the Assembly was on the basis of universal suffrage, which comprised all nationals over 18 years of age, registered in the Community of Madrid and in full enjoyment of their political rights. All members of the Assembly of Madrid were elected using the D'Hondt method and a closed list proportional representation, with an electoral threshold of five percent of valid votes—which included blank ballots—being applied regionally. The Assembly was entitled to one member per each 50,000 inhabitants or fraction greater than 25,000.

Election date
The term of the Assembly of Madrid expired four years after the date of its previous election. Elections to the Assembly were fixed for the fourth Sunday of May every four years.

The president had the prerogative to dissolve the Assembly of Madrid and call a snap election, provided that no motion of no confidence was in process, no nationwide election was due and some time requirements were met: namely, that dissolution did not occur either during the first legislative session or within the legislature's last year ahead of its scheduled expiry, nor before one year had elapsed since a previous dissolution. In the event of an investiture process failing to elect a regional president within a two-month period from the first ballot, the Assembly was to be automatically dissolved and a fresh election called. Any snap election held as a result of these circumstances would not alter the period to the next ordinary election, with elected deputies merely serving out what remained of their four-year terms.

Parties and candidates
The electoral law allowed for parties and federations registered in the interior ministry, coalitions and groupings of electors to present lists of candidates. Parties and federations intending to form a coalition ahead of an election were required to inform the relevant Electoral Commission within ten days of the election call, whereas groupings of electors needed to secure the signature of at least 0.5 percent of the electorate in the Community of Madrid, disallowing electors from signing for more than one list of candidates.

Below is a list of the main parties and electoral alliances which contested the election:

Opinion polls
The table below lists voting intention estimates in reverse chronological order, showing the most recent first and using the dates when the survey fieldwork was done, as opposed to the date of publication. Where the fieldwork dates are unknown, the date of publication is given instead. The highest percentage figure in each polling survey is displayed with its background shaded in the leading party's colour. If a tie ensues, this is applied to the figures with the highest percentages. The "Lead" column on the right shows the percentage-point difference between the parties with the highest percentages in a poll. When available, seat projections determined by the polling organisations are displayed below (or in place of) the percentages in a smaller font; 56 seats were required for an absolute majority in the Assembly of Madrid.

Results

Overall

Elected legislators
The following table lists the elected legislators sorted by order of election.

Aftermath
Investiture processes to elect the President of the Community of Madrid required for an absolute majority—more than half the votes cast—to be obtained in the first ballot. If unsuccessful, a new ballot would be held 48 hours later requiring of a simple majority—more affirmative than negative votes—to succeed. If none of such majorities were achieved, successive candidate proposals could be processed under the same procedure. In the event of the investiture process failing to elect a regional President within a two-month period from the first ballot, the Assembly would be automatically dissolved and a snap election called.

References
Opinion poll sources

Other

2003 in the Community of Madrid
Madrid
2003b
October 2003 events in Europe